Henderson Airport may refer to:

 Henderson Airport (Alabama), a former airport in Millers Ferry, Alabama, United States
 Henderson Aviation Airport in Felton, Delaware, United States (FAA: 0N6)
 Henderson City-County Airport in Henderson, Kentucky, United States (FAA: HNZ)
 Henderson Executive Airport in Las Vegas, Nevada, United States (FAA: HND)
 Henderson-Oxford Airport in Oxford, North Carolina, United States (FAA: HNZ)

See also
 Honiara International Airport, Solomon Islands, locally referred to as Henderson Airport after the World War II airfield (FAA: HIR)
 Rusk County Airport (Texas) in Henderson, Texas, United States (FAA: RFI)
 Henderson Field (disambiguation)